Bo Jonas Hilding Karlsson (born 12 October 1949) is a former football referee from Sweden. He refereed one match at the 1992 European Championships and one match at the 1994 World Cup. He also refereed the 1991 European Cup Winners' Cup Final between Manchester United and Barcelona.

In 2010, Karlsson appeared in Mattias Löw's documentary The Referee about Martin Hansson shown on Sveriges Television ahead of the World Cup in South Africa.

References
  Profile

1949 births
Living people
Swedish football referees
UEFA Champions League referees
FIFA World Cup referees
1994 FIFA World Cup referees
UEFA Euro 1992 referees